The United Nations Educational, Scientific and Cultural Organization (UNESCO) designates World Heritage Sites of outstanding universal value to cultural or natural heritage which  have been nominated by countries which are signatories to the UNESCO World Heritage Convention, established in 1972. Cultural heritage consists of monuments (such as architectural works, monumental sculptures, or inscriptions), groups of buildings, and sites (including archaeological sites). Natural features (consisting of physical and biological formations), geological and physiographical formations (including habitats of threatened species of animals and plants), and natural sites which are important from the point of view of science, conservation or natural beauty, are defined as natural heritage. Nepal ratified the convention on 20 June 1978, making its historical sites eligible for inclusion on the list.

, there are four sites in Nepal on the list and a further fifteen on the tentative list (the official list of sites that may be considered for future submission). The first sites in Nepal to be added to the list were  the Sagarmatha National Park and the Kathmandu Valley; both were added in 1979. However, due to the partial or substantial loss of the traditional elements of six out of seven monument zones and resulting general loss of authenticity and integrity of the whole property, Kathmandu Valley was put to the List of World Heritage in Danger between 2003 and 2007. Chitwan National Park was listed in 1984 and the most recent site listed was the Lumbini, the Birthplace of the Lord Buddha added in 1997. There are two natural and two are cultural sites in Nepal.

World Heritage Sites 
UNESCO lists sites under ten criteria; each entry must meet at least one of the criteria. Criteria i through vi are cultural, and vii through x are natural.

Tentative list 
In addition to the sites inscribed on the World Heritage List, member states can maintain a list of tentative sites that they may consider for nomination. Nominations for the World Heritage List are only accepted if the site was previously listed on the tentative list. , Nepal recorded 15 sites on its tentative list.

References 

 
 

 
Nepal
Nepal geography-related lists
World Heritage Sites
Cultural heritage of Nepal